Wu Shuqing (3 January 1932 – 10 January 2020) was a Chinese economist and educator. He was president of Peking University from August 1989 to August 1996 and vice-president of Renmin University of China.

Biography
Wu was born in Jiangyin, Jiangsu, Republic of China (1912-1949) on 3 January 1932. He attended Changshu Middle School and Shanghai High School. In August 1948, after the liberation of Tongxiang County, he was a staff member at the County Party Committee. In July 1952, he studied, then taught, at Renmin University of China, he served in several posts there, including instructor, professor, doctoral supervisor, and vice-president. He joined the Communist Party of China in 1955. In August 1989, he was appointed president of Peking University, replacing Ding Shisun, who did not prevent students of Peking University from joining the Tiananmen Square protests. When his term ended, he continued to serve as a professor, honorary director of the council and president of Education Foundation at the university.

Works

References

1932 births
2020 deaths
People from Jiangyin
Educators from Wuxi
Economists from Jiangsu
Writers from Wuxi
Renmin University of China alumni
Academic staff of Renmin University of China
Presidents of Peking University